Masker House is a historic house located in Wyckoff, Bergen County, New Jersey, United States. The house was built in 1780 and was added to the National Register of Historic Places on January 10, 1983. The original house was a three-bay, -story house built of sandstone. A 2-story frame addition was added to the right (east) of the original section.

See also
National Register of Historic Places listings in Bergen County, New Jersey

References

Houses on the National Register of Historic Places in New Jersey
Houses completed in 1780
Houses in Bergen County, New Jersey
Wyckoff, New Jersey
National Register of Historic Places in Bergen County, New Jersey
New Jersey Register of Historic Places